The Call may refer to:

Film and television 
 The Call, a 1936 French film better known as The Call of Silence or L'Appel du Silence
 The Call, a 2002 short film by Matthew Scott Krentz
 The Call (2013 film), an American crime thriller film
 The Call (2020 American film), an American horror film
 The Call (2020 South Korean film), a South Korean thriller film
 The Call (American TV program), a 2007–2011 American business news television program that aired on CNBC
 The Call (South Korean TV series), a 2018 South Korean music collaboration project-themed music variety game show that aired on Mnet and tvN
 The Call, an interactive news program on NY1
 "The Call" (The Twilight Zone), an episode of the television series The Twilight Zone
The Call (2019 Nollywood film) is a Nollywood comedic movie by Woli Arole

Publications 
 The Call (Kansas City), a newspaper in Kansas City, Missouri, serving the Black American community
 The New York Call, sometimes simply called The Call, a Socialist newspaper published by the Socialist Party of America
 The San Francisco Call
 The Call (Woonsocket), a general-interest daily newspaper in Woonsocket, Rhode Island
 The Call (Flanagan novel), a 1998 historical novel by Martin Flanagan
 The Call (Hersey novel), a 1985 novel by John Hersey
 Der Ruf (newspaper), a World War II era POW newspaper, known in English as The Call
 The Call (BSP) an Organ of International Socialism published by the British Socialist Party

Music 
 Call (band), a Pakistani rock band based in Lahore
 The Call (band), a Santa Cruz, California-based rock band

Albums
 The Call (Charles Lloyd album), 1994
 The Call (Heed album), 2006
 The Call (Mal Waldron album), 1971
 The Call, album by underground Hip Hop artist Random
 The Call, EP by metal band Necrophobic
 The Call (Henry Grimes album), 1966

Songs
 "The Call" (Anne Murray song)
 "The Call" (Backstreet Boys song)
"The Call", song No. 4 from Five Mystical Songs
 "The Call", a song by Killswitch Engage from their 2013 album Disarm the Descent
 "The Call", a song by Regina Spektor from the soundtrack to The Chronicles of Narnia: Prince Caspian
 "The Call", a song by Little Texas on their 1997 album Little Texas
 "The Call", a song by Matt Kennon on his 2010 album Matt Kennon
 "The Call", a song by Gotthard on their 2007 album Domino Effect
 "Die Stem van Suid-Afrika", former national anthem of South Africa, used during the apartheid era
 "Ireland's Call", song used to represent Ireland at rugby games

Other 
 The Call (organization), an evangelical parachurch organization
 The Call (painting), a 1902 painting by Paul Gauguin
 An infamous blown call in Game 6 of the 1985 World Series by Major League Baseball umpire Don Denkinger

See also 
 Call (disambiguation)